New Zealand won 2 medals at the 1992 Winter Paralympics: 2 golds, 0 silver and 0 bronze medals.

See also
 New Zealand at the Paralympics

References

External links
 International Paralympic Committee
 Paralympics New Zealand

Nations at the 1992 Winter Paralympics
1992
Paralympics